Kostyantyn Panin (born 8 December 1975) is a Ukrainian midfielder who has recently played for FC Zhetysu in Kazakhstan.

External links
 

1975 births
Living people
Ukrainian footballers
Ukrainian expatriate footballers
Expatriate footballers in Russia
Expatriate footballers in Poland
Expatriate footballers in Kazakhstan
Association football midfielders
Amica Wronki players
FC Kairat players
FC Kyzylzhar players
FC Chornomorets Odesa players
FC Dynamo Vologda players
FC Sheksna Cherepovets players
People from Nikopol, Ukraine
Sportspeople from Dnipropetrovsk Oblast